Charles Carew Page (25 April 1884 – 10 April 1921) was an English amateur cricketer who played first-class cricket for Middlesex and Cambridge University from 1905 to 1909. He was born in Barnet and died in Woking.

A "free and stylish batsman", Page's highest score was 164 not out for Middlesex against Somerset at Lord's in 1908, made out of 262 in 110 minutes, and including 28 fours. His other century was 117 for Middlesex against Lancashire, also at Lord's, in 1905.

Page was also a football player for Cambridge, Old Malvernians and the Corinthians.

References

External links
 
 Charles Page at CricketArchive

1884 births
1921 deaths
People from Chipping Barnet
People educated at Malvern College
English cricketers
English footballers
Middlesex cricketers
Marylebone Cricket Club cricketers
Cambridge University cricketers
Gentlemen cricketers
Gentlemen of England cricketers
H. D. G. Leveson Gower's XI cricketers
Corinthian F.C. players
Association footballers not categorized by position